The Military ranks of the Maldives are the ranks used by the Maldives National Defence Force. The ranks are based on a combination of the traditional British military system and the U.S. military system. The highest flag rank ever awarded was that of lieutenant general, in a non-military capacity to the previous Minister of Defence, Abdul Sattar, although the President being the Commander-in-Chief, used to hold the rank of general in a non-military capacity. However, after the restructuring efforts in 2012, the highest military rank in Maldives National Defence Force is set to Major General rank, designated to the Chief of Defence Force.

Ranks

Officers

Warrant officer corps

Enlisted

References

 Official website
 Uniforminsignia.org (Maldives National Defence Force)

Maldives
Military of the Maldives
Maldives and the Commonwealth of Nations